Yaroslav Yevgenyevich Nilov (Rus. Ярослав Евгеньевич Нилов; born March 20, 1982, Chisinau, Moldova) is a Russian politician and deputy of the State Duma of the Russian Federation. He is a member of the Chairman of the Duma Committee on Labor, Social Policy and Veterans' Affairs. He is a member of the populist Liberal Democratic Party of Russia.

Biography

Nilov joined the Liberal Democratic Party of Russia in 1997 after which he helped create the party's young wing in the Lyuberysy Moscow Region. In 2005, he graduated from the Moscow Power Engineering Institute.

From 1998 to 2003, Nilov was an assistant to LDPR leader Vladimir Zhirinovsky and created the youth organization "Center for 
Youth Initiatives".  From 2003 to 2007, Nilov was continue as an assistant  Zhirinovsky who at that time held the post of deputy chairman of the State Duma. From 2007 to 2011, Nilov was the Head of the Secretariat of Deputy Chairman of the State Duma Vladimir Zhirinovsky.

In March 2016, Zhirinovsky named Nilov, now a member of the LDPR Supreme Council, one of his possible successors.

On 24 March 2022, the United States Treasury sanctioned him in response to the 2022 Russian invasion of Ukraine.

References

1982 births
Living people
Politicians from Chișinău
Liberal Democratic Party of Russia politicians
Fifth convocation members of the State Duma (Russian Federation)
Sixth convocation members of the State Duma (Russian Federation)
Seventh convocation members of the State Duma (Russian Federation)
Moscow Power Engineering Institute alumni
Eighth convocation members of the State Duma (Russian Federation)
Russian individuals subject to the U.S. Department of the Treasury sanctions